A stone circle is a ring of standing stones. Most are found in Northwestern Europe – especially in Britain, Ireland, and Brittany – and typically date from the Late Neolithic and Early Bronze Age, with most being built from 3000 BC. The best known examples include those at the henge monument at Avebury, the Rollright Stones, and elements within the ring of standing stones at Stonehenge. Scattered examples exist from other parts of Europe. Later, during the Iron Age, stone circles were built in southern Scandinavia.

Stone circles are usually grouped in terms of the shape and size of the stones, the span of their radius, and their population within the local area. Although many theories have been advanced to explain their use, usually related to providing a setting for ceremony or ritual, no consensus exists among archaeologists regarding their intended function. Their construction often involved considerable communal effort, including specialist tasks such as planning, quarrying, transportation, laying the foundation trenches, and final construction.

Dates and archaeology
Growing evidence suggests that megalithic constructions began as early as 5000 BC in northwestern France and that the custom and techniques spread via sea routes throughout Europe and the Mediterranean region from there. The Carnac Stones in France are estimated to have been built around 4500 BC, and many of the formations include megalithic stone circles. 

The earliest stone circles in Britain were erected 3000–2500 BC, during the Middle Neolithic (c. 3700–2500 BC). Around that time, stone circles began to be built in the coastal and lowland areas towards the north of the United Kingdom. The Langdale axe industry in the Lake District may have been an important early centre for circle building, perhaps because of its economic power. Many had closely set stones, perhaps similar to the earth banks of henges. Others were constructed from boulders placed stably on the ground rather than standing stones held erect by a foundation trench. Recent research shows that the two oldest stone circles in Britain (Stenness on Orkney and Callanish on the Isle of Lewis) were constructed to align with solar and lunar positions.

Most sites do not contain evidence of human dwelling, suggesting that stone circles were constructed for ceremonies.
Sometimes, a stone circle is found in association with a burial pit or burial chamber, but most of these monuments have no such known association because of a lack of archaeological investigation.

Variants

Recumbent and axial stone circle

Recumbent stone circles are a variation containing a single large stone placed on its side. The stones are often ordered by height, with the tallest being the portals, with gradually reducing heights around each side of the circle, down to the recumbent stone, which is the lowest. This type is found throughout the British Isles and Brittany, with 71 examples in Scotland and at least 20 in south-west Ireland. In the latter nation they are generally called axial stone circles, including Drombeg stone circle near Rosscarbery, County Cork. 

Scottish recumbent circles are usually flanked by the two largest of the standing stones immediately on either side. These are known as 'flankers'. The stones are commonly graded in height with the lowest stones being diametrically opposite to the tall flankers. The circle commonly contains a ring cairn and cremation remains. 

Irish axial stone circles are found in Cork and Kerry counties. These do not have tall flanking stones on either side of the recumbent stone. Instead, there are two tall stones at the side of the circle opposite the recumbent stone. These are known as 'portals', as they form an entrance into the circle. Often the portals are turned so that their flat sides face each other, rather than facing the centre of the circle.

Concentric stone circle

A concentric stone circle is a type of prehistoric monument consisting of a circular or oval arrangement of two or more stone circles set within one another. They were in use from the late Neolithic to the end of the early Bronze Age and are found in England and Scotland.

Cobble pavements have been found in the centre of many examples. Connected features at some sites include central mounds, outlying standing stones, and avenues or circular banks on which the stones are set. Alternatively, they may be replicas of earlier timber circles rebuilt in stone, especially the examples in Wessex.

A funerary purpose is thought to be likely, especially by Aubrey Burl. He thought that such sites in Cumbria are analogous to the kerbs that surround some chamber tombs. Burials have been found at all excavated concentric stone circles: both inhumations and cremations. The burnt remains have been found either within an urn or placed directly in the earth.

Distribution

Megalithic monuments are found in especially great number on the European Atlantic fringe and in the British Isles.

Britain and Ireland

There are approximately 1300 stone circles in Britain and Ireland. Experts disagree on whether the construction of megaliths in Britain developed independently or was imported from mainland Europe. 

A 2019 comprehensive radiocarbon dating study of megalithic structures across Europe and the British Isles concluded that construction techniques were spread to other communities via sea routes, starting from north-western France. In contrast, the French archaeologist Jean-Pierre Mohen in his book  wrote that the British Isles are "outstanding in the abundance of standing stones, and the variety of circular architectural complexes of which they formed a part ... strikingly original, they have no equivalent elsewhere in Europe – strongly supporting the argument that the builders were independent."Some theories suggest that invaders from Brittany may have been responsible for constructing Stonehenge.

Although stone circles are widely distributed across the island, Ireland has two main concentrations: in the Cork/Kerry area and in mid-Ulster. The latter typically consist of a greater number of small stones, usually 1' (0.3 metres) high, and are often found in upland areas and on sites that also contain a stone alignment. The Cork–Kerry stone circles tend to be more irregular in shape with larger but fewer and more widely-spaced orthostats around the axial stone.

Continental Europe
Examples can be found throughout Continental Europe, from the Black Sea to Brittany. Locations in France include several in Brittany (two on the island of Er Lannic and two more suggested at Carnac), several in the south of France on the Causse de Blandas in the Cevennes, in the Pyrenees, and in the Alps (e.g. the Petit Saint Bernard). One notable stone circle is in the Italian Alps. As early as 1579, scholars in Germany described large erect stone circles near Ballenstedt. In 2001, a stone circle (Beglik Tash) was discovered in Bulgaria near the Black Sea.

There are several examples in the Alentejo region of Portugal, the oldest and most complete being the Almendres Cromlech near the regional capital of Évora and within its municipality. Remains of many others consist only of the central anta (as they are known in the Alentejo). This sometimes appears to have been used as an altar but more often as a central burial structure, originally surrounded by megaliths that show only sparsely survived erosion and human activities.

These circles are also known as harrespil in the Basque country, where villagers call them mairu-baratz or jentil-baratz, meaning "pagan garden (cemetery)". They refer to mythological giants of the pre-Christian era. No example has survived in a good state of preservation, but, like the Alentejo, the Basque Country is dotted with eroded and vandalized examples of many such structures.

Africa
Ancient stone circles are found throughout the Horn of Africa. Booco in northeastern Somalia contains a number of such old structures. Small stone circles here surround two enclosed platform monuments, which are set together. The circles of stone are believed to mark associated graves.

At Emba Derho in the Ethiopian and Eritrean highlands, two kinds of megalithic circles are found. The first type consists of single stone circles, whereas the second type comprises an inner circle enclosed within a larger circle (i.e. double stone circles).

On the western side of the continent, the Senegambian stone circles can be found. The individual groups are dated from 700 A.D. to 1350 A.D.

Asia 
In the Near East, possibly the oldest stone circles in the world were found at Atlit Yam (about 8000 BC). The locality is now submerged near the Levantine Mediterranean coast.

Other locations include India or Japan. See more in the relevant Wikipedia category

References

Footnotes

Sources

Further reading

External links

 Interactive map of megalithic monuments in Europe.

 
Megalithic monuments
Types of monuments and memorials
Late Neolithic
es:Crómlech